Anwar Ali (1913–5 November 1974) was a Pakistani economist who was the third governor of the Saudi Arabian Monetary Agency. He headed the agency from 1958 to his death in 1974. Ali also held several positions at the ministry of finance in India and Pakistan and at the International Monetary Fund.

Biography
Ali was born in 1913 in India into a Muslim family. He settled in Pakistan and became a Pakistani national. He received a master's degree in Lahore. He served as the undersecretary in the Ministry of Finance in India, deputy undersecretary in the Ministry of Finance in Pakistan and director of the National Bank in Pakistan.

Then he settled in the United States. He joined the International Monetary Fund (IMF) in 1954 and was named the director of the Middle East department of the IMF. He left the IMF in 1958 and was appointed by Crown Prince and Prime Minister Faisal as the governor of the Saudi Arabian Monetary Agency on 11 October that year. Ali developed annual report systems and established the investment department of the agency. One of his deputies at the agency was Mohammed bin Faisal, a son of Crown Prince Faisal, from the late 1950s to August 1965. He was appointed a member of the Supreme Council on Petroleum in March 1973 when it was established by King Faisal.

Ali was married and the father of two. He died at age 61 during an official visit on 5 November 1974 in Washington D.C. following a heart attack in late October. There he met with the officials of the World Bank and the International Monetary Fund. Ali's successor was Abdulaziz Al Quraishi, the first Saudi to head the agency.

References

20th-century American economists
1913 births
1974 deaths
Governors of the Saudi Arabian Monetary Agency
International Monetary Fund people
Pakistani expatriates in Saudi Arabia
Pakistani expatriates in the United States
Pakistani Muslims